Adrien Henri Payn (Paris, 30 July 1800 – Montévrain, 3 October 1855) was a 19th-century French novelist and playwright.

His plays were presented on the most important Parisian stages of the 19th-century, including the Théâtre de l'Ambigu-Comique, the Théâtre du Gymnase-Dramatique and the Théâtre de la Porte-Saint-Martin. In collaboration with Benjamin Antier and Polyanthe, Payn authored the famous drama l’Auberge des Adrets.

Payn was the mayor of the city of Montévrain from 1848 to 1854. He died aged 55.

Works 
1823: La Cousine supposée, comedy in 1 act and in prose, with René Perin and Villard
1828: Roc l'exterminateur, melodrama comique in 3 acts, with Théodore Nézel
1831: Le Tir et le restaurant, comédie-vaudeville in 1 act, with Nézel and Armand Joseph Overnay
1831: Le Watchman, drama in 3 acts and 6 tableaux, with Benjamin Antier and Overnay
1832: Marie-Rose, ou la Nuit de Noël, three-act drama, with Saint-Amand
1835: Chérubin, ou le Page de Napoléon, two-act comédie en vaudeville, with Adrien Delaville, Charles Desnoyer, Edmond de Biéville and Adrien Viguier
1836: Le Doyen de Killerine, two-act comédie en vaudeville after the novel by Abbé Prévost, with Overnay
1840: La Peur du tonnerre, vaudeville in 1 act, with Overnay
1850: Trois amours d'anglais, ballet-comique

Bibliography 
 Joseph Marie Quérard, Les supercheries littéraires dévoilées: Galerie des écrivains, vol.1, 1869, (p. 199)

19th-century French dramatists and playwrights
19th-century French novelists
Writers from Paris
1800 births
1855 deaths